Cleveaceae is a family of liverworts belonging to the order Marchantiales.

Genera:
 Athalamia Falc.
 Clevea Lindb.
 Peltolepis Lindb.
 Sauteria Nees

References

Marchantiales
Liverwort families